Negin Mirhasani Vahed is an Iranian artist manager, producer and costume designer and the first female theater producer in Iran. She has also been responsible for the costume design of a variety of plays and television series.

Work

TV series
 2016 Heights Underneath, producer, Director: Mohsen Moeini, seven-episode teleplay, channel 4 
 2014 Utrush, costume designer, 13-episode teleplay, Director: Mohsen Moeini

Plays
 2011 Tenth Mind, (producer and costume designer), Nazerzadeh Hall, Iranshahr theater 
 2012 The Actor and His Wife, (producer and costume designer), starring Ali Nassirian and Mahboobeh Bayat, Niavaran Cultural Center 
 2012 Dozing-off, (producer and costume designer), starring Ali Nassirian and Mahboobeh Bayat, Niavaran Cultural Center 
 2013 Turandot, (producer and costume designer), adapted from Puccini’s opera and  Nezami’s story, Niavaran Cultural Center 
 2014 On the Fast Horse, (producer and costume designer), Milad Tower, Tehran 
 2014 A Thousand Mirrors, (producer and costume designer),  Milad Tower, Tehran 
 2015 The Chant of Gabriel's Wing, (producer and costume designer), Andisheh Hall 
 2015 Kaspar, (producer and costume designer), a play by Peter Handke, Av theater (Da) 
 2016 Lion in Chains, (producer and costume designer), Andisheh Hall 
 2017 Blood on the Cat's Neck, (producer and costume designer), Baran theater

See also
Cinema of Iran
Iranian modern and contemporary art
Persian theatre

References

External links
 http://www.bashgah.net/fa/category/show/60811 

Iranian theatre directors
Living people
People from Tehran
Iranian contemporary artists
Year of birth missing (living people)